is the Japanese term used to describe the urban lifestyle and culture, especially the pleasure-seeking aspects, of Edo period Japan (1600–1867).  culture developed in Yoshiwara, the licensed red-light district of Edo (modern-day Tokyo), the site of many brothels frequented by Japan's growing middle class. A prominent author of the  genre was Ihara Saikaku, who wrote The Life of an Amorous Woman.  culture also arose in other cities, such as Osaka and Kyoto.

The term  in medieval Japan was associated with Buddhism and meant "this transient, unreliable world". When written as meaning "the floating world", is also an ironic, homophonous allusion to the earlier Buddhist term , referring to the earthly plane of death and rebirth from which Buddhists sought release.

In its modern usage, the term  is used to refer to a state of mind emphasising living in the moment, detached from the difficulties of life.

See also
 Demimonde

References

Cultural history of Japan
Japanese words and phrases
Ukiyo-e